The UK Dance Chart is a weekly chart that ranks the biggest-selling dance singles in the United Kingdom, and is compiled by The Official Charts Company. The dates listed in the menus below represent the Saturday after the Sunday the chart was announced, as per the way the dates are given in chart publications such as the ones produced by Billboard, Guinness, and Virgin. In 2006, the chart was based on sales of CD singles and 12-inch singles, and was published in the UK magazines ChartsPlus and Music Week and on BBC Radio 1's official website. During the year, 31 singles reached number one.

The biggest-selling dance hit of 2006 was "Put Your Hands Up for Detroit" by Fedde le Grand—it sold approximately 184,000 copies in the UK and topped the UK Singles Chart. "Put Your Hands Up for Detroit" was also the longest-running number one of year, spending nine weeks at the top over six separate runs. Other high-selling dance singles included "Somebody's Watching Me" by Beatfreakz, which sold roughly 137,000 copies, and "Sorry" by Madonna, which sold approximately 136,000 singles. "Sorry" also topped the UK Singles Chart. Three acts topped the chart with more than one single. They were: Mylo, DJ Fresh and Madonna. The only act to top the chart with more than two singles was Madonna, who reached number one with three different singles during the year.

Chart history

See also
List of number-one singles of 2006 (UK)
List of UK Dance Albums Chart number ones of 2006
List of UK Independent Singles Chart number ones of 2006
List of UK Rock & Metal Singles Chart number ones of 2006

References
General

Specific

External links
Dance Singles Chart at The Official UK Charts Company
UK Top 40 Dance Singles at BBC Radio 1

2006
UK Dance Chart number-one singles
United Kingdom Dance Singles